Nicola Jane "Nicky" Hunt (born 29 January 1985 in Stevenage) is a British archer. She competes in compound archery and in 2010 reached 1st position in the FITA world rankings. In partnership with Nichola Simpson and Danielle Brown she helped the English team win the women's compound team event at the 2010 Commonwealth Games in Delhi then added the individual gold medal a day later.
She has won rounds of the FITA Archery World Cup in 2009 (Porec) and 2010 (Shanghai).
Hunt is a member of Deben Archery Club.

References

External links
 

British female archers
1985 births
Living people
Commonwealth Games gold medallists for England
People from Stevenage
People educated at Fearnhill School
Archers at the 2015 European Games
European Games competitors for Great Britain
Commonwealth Games medallists in archery
Archers at the 2010 Commonwealth Games
20th-century British women
21st-century British women
Medallists at the 2010 Commonwealth Games